G.B.H. is a 1991 soundtrack album by Elvis Costello and Richard Harvey, the first of two collaborations between the two. G.B.H was a seven-part Channel 4 series first aired in the UK in 1991. Despite the participation of Costello, the music is not rock, which was a surprise to critics at the time it was first released.

Track listing
All compositions written by Elvis Costello and Richard Harvey unless otherwise indicated.
 "G.B.H. Opening Titles: The Life and Times of Michael Murray" – 4:32
 "It Wasn't Me" – 2:01
 "Men of Alloy" – 3:51
 "Lambs to the Slaughter" – 4:17
 "Bubbles" – 2:11
 "The 'Goldilocks' Theme" – 3:06
 "Perfume - The Odour of Money" – 4:03
 "Barbara Douglas: Assassin" – 3:09
 "Pursuit Suite" – 5:06
 "The Roaring Boy", with The Prufrock Quartet (Costello, The Prufrock Quartet) –  4:01
 "'So I Used Five!'" – 1:27
 "Love from a Cold Land" – 2:28
 "In a Cemetery Garden" – 1:57
 "'Smack 'Im'" – 2:15
 "Woodlands - On Joy!" (Harvey) – 3:45
 "'It's Cold Up There'" – 2:52
 "Going Home Service" – 5:06
 "Grave Music" – 2:29
 "The Puppet Masters' Work" – 4:10
 "'He's So Easy'" – 1:58
 "Another Time, Another Place" – 2:02
 "Closing Titles" – 2:32

References

Elvis Costello albums
Albums produced by Elvis Costello
1991 soundtrack albums
Television soundtracks
Rykodisc soundtracks